Spider in the Web is a 2019 spy thriller film directed and co-produced by Eran Riklis, produced by Sabine Brian, Jacqueline de Goeij, Leon Edrey and Michael Sharfstein with screenplay written by Gidon Maron and Emmanuel Naccahe. Starring Ben Kingsley, Monica Bellucci, Itzik Cohen and Itay Tiran, Spider in the Web focuses on a young operative who is sent on a mission to follow an older agent, whose behavior has come into question.

The film is an international co-production of Israel, Belgium and United Kingdom that was released on 30 August 2019 in the United States and on 16 January 2020 in Israel.

Cast
 Ben Kingsley as Adereth
 Monica Bellucci as Angela Caroni
 Itay Tiran as Daniel
 Itzik Cohen as Samuel
 Filip Peeters as Jan Martens
 Hilde Van Mieghem as Anne-Marie

Reception
On Rotten Tomatoes the film has a rating of 67% based on reviews from 9 critics.

Noel Murray of the Los Angeles Times called it "the kind of story that’s been told many times in literary spy novels" but that it was "a magnificent showcase for Kingsley, who's always at his best when his characters look like they know something we don't."
Frank Scheck of The Hollywood Reporter wrote: "Tinker tailor soldier snooze."

References

External links
 

2019 multilingual films
2010s English-language films
2010s Hebrew-language films
2010s Arabic-language films
Films directed by Eran Riklis
British spy thriller films
Belgian spy thriller films
Israeli thriller films
British multilingual films
Israeli multilingual films
Belgian multilingual films
2010s British films